Murray-Sunset is a locality in the Australian state of Victoria in the west of the state adjoining the border with South Australia.  The principal land use is conservation with most of the locality being occupied by the Murray-Sunset National Park.

References

Towns in Victoria (Australia)